Janetschekbrya is a genus of slender springtails in the family Entomobryidae. There are at least two described species in Janetschekbrya.

Species
These two species belong to the genus Janetschekbrya:
 Janetschekbrya arida Christiansen and Bellinger, 1980 i c g
 Janetschekbrya himalica Yosii, 1971 i c g
Data sources: i = ITIS, c = Catalogue of Life, g = GBIF, b = Bugguide.net

References

Further reading

 
 
 

Springtail genera